Designer People is a television documentary series launched in 2008 directed by Ross Close. Each episode showcases one of the world's leading artists in architectural design, communication design, industrial design, interior design, and fashion, centering on the creative insight of the acclaimed designer, whose work shapes our lives and our surroundings. The series was broadcast on Ovation.

Hosts
Erika Oman
Lee Lin Chin
Amy Devers

Seasons 
Two full seasons have been broadcast. The Season 1 series was broadcast originally from 10 November 2008 to 29 January 2009. A second season started 9 November 2009 to 30 April 2010.
 
Season 1 (2008-2009)
Yves Behar: Swiss industrial designer and founder of Fuseproject (10 Nov 2008)
Chris Lee: communication designer and founder of Asylum design company
Jakob Trollback: Swedish communication designer
Qiu Hao: Chinese fashion designer
Ole Scheeren: German architectfamous for his design of the CCTV headquarters in Beijing
Max Wolff: Australian automotive designer
Edward Fella: commercial graphic designer
Young Baek Min: Korean interior designer
Nipa Doshi & Jonathan Levien: Industrial designers discussing their creative partnership
Antonio Ochoa: Venezuelan architect and interior designer
Jens Martin Skibsted: Danish industrial designer
Kenji Ekuan: Japanese industrial designer 
Anouska Hempel

Season 2 (2009-2010)
Zaha Hadid
Marc Newson
Marcel Wanders
Michael Young
Zandra Rhodes
Jürgen Mayer
Ilan Waisbrod
Gilles et Boissier
Bjarke Ingels
Mitchell Wolfson Jr.
Karim Rashid
Emmanuel Picault
M/M Paris

References

External links

2008 American television series debuts